Sohni Mahiwal is a 1958 Indian Hindi-language historical romance film directed by Raja Nawathe and produced by J. N. Choudhary. The film stars Bharat Bhushan, Nimmi and Om Prakash in lead roles. The film's music is composed by Naushad. It is based on the tragic romance of Sohni Mahiwal.

Cast
Bharat Bhushan		
Nimmi
Om Prakash		
Mukri		
Achala Sachdev		
M. Kumar		
Chand Burke		
Lotan

Soundtrack

The score and soundtrack for the movie was composed by Naushad, with lyrics penned by Shakeel Badayuni. The soundtrack consists of 13 songs, featuring vocals by Mohammed Rafi, Lata Mangeshkar and Mahendra Kapoor.

References

External links 
 

1958 films
1950s Hindi-language films
Films scored by Naushad
Films directed by Raja Nawathe
Films based on Indian folklore